Bucculatrix inusitata is a moth in the family Bucculatricidae. It is found in North America, where it has been recorded from Quebec, Ontario, Indiana, Maine, Massachusetts, New York and New Jersey. It was described in 1963 by Annette Frances Braun.

The wingspan is 9.5–10 mm.

The larvae possibly feed on Juniperus communis.

References

Natural History Museum Lepidoptera generic names catalog

Bucculatricidae
Moths described in 1963
Moths of North America
Taxa named by Annette Frances Braun